The EY Entrepreneur of the Year Awards previously Ernst & Young Entrepreneur of the Year Awards is an award sponsored by Ernst & Young in recognition of entrepreneurship. 
Founded in 1986 in Milwaukee as a single award, as of 2016 twenty-five programs were run in all 50 US states and more than 60 countries.

The award may be given to multiple individuals per year; for example, in 2013 there were ten winners in the state of New York, with winners in the categories of retail and consumer products; technology; family business; emerging; energy, chemical and mining; food products and services; real estate, hospitality, and construction; financial services; digital media; and transformational. In 2014, there were eleven national winners in the US; with one individual recognized as the overall award winner.

Since 1986, over 10,000 people have received awards. averaging 400 recipients annually.

EY World Entrepreneur of the Year
Every year since 1986, the overall country winners have gathered in Monte Carlo, Monaco, for EY World Entrepreneur of the Year. 
Nominees are reviewed by an independent judging panel of business leaders and previous award recipients. All country winners are inducted into the EY World Entrepreneur of the Year Hall of Fame. The judges for EY World Entrepreneur of the Year 2020 were Manny Stul, Chairman and Co-CEO, Moose Toys, Rosaleen Blair CBE, Founder and Chair, Alexander Mann Solutions, Emine Sabancı Kamışlı, Co-founder and Vice Chairperson, Esas Holding, George Hongchoy, Executive Director and CEO, Link Asset Management Limited, Sipho Nkosi, Chairman, Sasol and Hernan Kazah, Co-founder and Managing Partner, Kaszek Ventures.

21st century recipients

Other awards 
Along with the World Entrepreneur of the Year EY also bestows other award titles.

EY Entrepreneur of the Year Alumni Social Impact Award 
Inaugurated in 2018, the EY Entrepreneur of the Year Alumni Social Impact Award recognizes the achievements of business leaders whose legacies have had global impact. This award is peer-selected by EOY alumni that form the Global Alumni Council. Recipients of this award are considered to be EOY alumni.

References

External links 

 "EY World Entrepreneur Of The Year™ Award winners" Ernst & Young, EY.com. 2019.

Year of establishment missing
Business and industry awards
Ernst & Young
Awards established in 1986
1986 establishments in Wisconsin